Patrick Claiborne Meagher (February 18, 1869 - November 24, 1920) was a Democratic member of the Mississippi House of Representatives, representing Yazoo County, from 1916 until his death.

Biography 
Patrick Claiborne Meagher was born on February 18, 1869, in Dover, Yazoo County, Mississippi. His parents were Irish immigrant and Confederate Civil War veteran Patrick Farrell Meagher, and Maggie (Riley) Meagher. He was the Treasurer of Yazoo County until 1916. He was first elected to the Mississippi House of Representatives to represent his native Yazoo County, as a Democrat, in November 1915. He was re-elected in 1919. However, he died on November 24, 1920, in Yazoo County, before his term ended. He never married.

References 

1869 births
1920 deaths
Democratic Party members of the Mississippi House of Representatives
People from Yazoo County, Mississippi